The Padua family (FIN: 507), also known as the Lydia family, is a mid-sized family of asteroids of more than a thousand members.

The family is at least 25 million years old. Its members were previously associated to 110 Lydia, and are predominantly X-type asteroids with an albedo of approximately 0.1. Together with the Agnia family, the Padua family is the only other family to have most of its members in a nonlinear secular resonance configuration with more than 75% of its members in a z1 librating state.

The Paduan (Lydian) asteroids are located in the outer part of the central asteroid belt having a semi-major axis of approximately 2.75. The family's namesake is the asteroid 363 Padua, while 110 Lydia is now a suspected interloper, despite having the same spectral type.

Members 

Some prominent members with known spectral type. A list of all Paduan aststeroids is given at the "Small Bodies Data Ferret".

Lydia former namesake and potential interloper 

In previous works (Zappala et al. 1995), this family was named Lydia after 110 Lydia, which is an X-type asteroid in the SMASS classification (Tholen: M-type). While Lydia is still a member of the now-called Padua family (Nesvorny 2005, AstDyS), it has been suspected that it might be an interloper in its "own" family despite its matching spectral type (Carruba 2009; Mothe-Diniz et al. 2005).

Also, the asteroid 308 Polyxo was formerly considered the family's largest member. This T-type asteroid is no-longer considered a family member and is categorized as a background asteroid on AstDyS.

References 
 

Asteroid groups and families